Kalamata railway station is a distused railway station in Kalamata, Greece. located within the city itself. Opened 1892 by the Piraeus, Athens and Peloponnese Railways (now part of OSE). Until 2010 TrainOSE operated Local and Regional services to Katakolo, Pyrgos and Olympia and Kyparissia, and a suburban service to Messini and the General Hospital. At present, it is served by excursion trains while remaining inactive on other routes, but the area houses the open-air railway park, with several railway exhibits. Previously Piraeus, Athens and Peloponnese Railways operated a narrow gauge service to Athens from Kalamata.

History 
The station was opened in 1892 as part of Piraeus, Athens and Peloponnese Railways. Part of the station still functions in this picturesque 1892 structure. The building is an example of industrial architecture, built of stone, while its roof is constructed of wood covered with tile. The door and window frames are decorated with red bricks while the windows are arched. The doors are paneled, while the outline of the building has a decorative ribbon. The intermediate part of the station building is two-story.

In 1920 SPAP was briefly nationalized as part of the Hellenic State Railways but became an independent company two years later. During the Axis occupation of Greece in World War 2, and especially during the withdrawal of German troops in 1944, the network and the rolling stock suffered extensive damage both by the German army and by Greek resistance groups. Repair of SPAP assets was time-consuming and expensive. Damaged rolling stock was mainly repaired at Piraeus Engine Sheds. Normal levels of service resumed at about 1948, with the exception of the destroyed bridge of Achladokampos (between Argos and Tripoli), which was rebuilt in 1974. Due to high debts, SPAP came under government control in 1939–1940 and was formally nationalized again in 1954. In 1962 the company was absorbed by the Hellenic State Railways. In 1962 SPAP was absorbed into Hellenic State Railways (SEK). In 1970 OSE became the legal successor to the SEK, taking over responsibilities for most of Greece's rail infrastructure.

In 2009, with the Greek debt crisis unfolding OSE's Management was forced to reduce services across the network. Timetables were cut back, and routes closed as the government-run entity attempted to reduce overheads. In 2011 all passenger and freight services on the metre gauge railway system in the Peloponnese were suspended, with the likelihood of full restoration of services a distant prospect. However, a short section through the port city of Patras remains open as a suburban railway. In 2017 OSE's passenger transport sector was privatised as TrainOSE, currently a wholly owned subsidiary of Ferrovie dello Stato Italiane infrastructure, including stations, remained under the control of OSE. As of 2014, Eurolines rents the building.

It was announced in July 2020 that the sections from Patras to Pirgos and Corinth- Kalamata and the branch to Napfion will reopen in 2021.

Facilities
The station building is still intact, if a little rundown. There are toilets and parking onsite. Local and regional buses stop in the forecourt. In 2008 there was a working public phone outside the Booking hall, however it is unknown if it is still in working order?

Services 
until 2010 TrainOSE operated Local and Regional services to Katakolo, Pyrgos and Olympia and Kyparissia, and a suburban service to Messini and the General Hospital. At present, it is served by excursion trains, while remaining inactive on other routes, but the area houses the open-air railway park, with several railway exhibits. Previously Piraeus, Athens and Peloponnese Railways operated a narrow gauge service to Athens from Kalamata; however, this service later upgraded to Standard-gauge and now forms the backbone of Line 5 of the Athens Suburban Railway.

Station layout

Gallery

External links
 Το Τρενάκι του Πηλίου - GTP

References

Transport in Peloponnese (region)
Railway stations in Peloponnese (region)
Railway stations opened in 1892
Buildings and structures in Peloponnese (region)
Kalamata
Eclectic architecture in Greece
Piraeus, Athens and Peloponnese Railways